"Scherzo à la russe", Op. 1, No. 1, is part of the first published work of Pyotr Ilyich Tchaikovsky in 1867, Two Pieces for Piano, Op. 1.

It is based on a Russian folk tune in B-flat major, that the composer had earlier used in his first attempt to write a string quartet. It was first called Capriccio (Italian, "whim") but was later changed to "Scherzo à la russe". The other piece in the work was called "Impromptu" in E-flat minor, Op. 1, No. 2.

References

Compositions by Pyotr Ilyich Tchaikovsky
1867 compositions
Compositions for solo piano
Compositions using folk songs